The 2021 African Badminton Championships was the continental badminton championships to crown the best players and teams across Africa. The tournament was held at the MTN Arena in Kampala, Uganda, from 21 to 28 October.

Tournament 
The 2021 African Badminton Championships were held in two separate events. The mixed team event, officially All Africa Mixed Team Championships 2021, was a continental tournament to crown the best team in Africa holding from 21 to 24 October. The individual event, officially All Africa Individual Championships 2021, was a continental tournament to crown the best players in Africa holding from 26 to 28 October. A total of 11 countries across Africa registered their players to compete at this event.

Venue 
This tournament was held at the MTN Arena, Kampala with three courts.

Point distribution
The individual event of this tournament was graded based on the BWF points system for the BWF International Challenge event. Below is the table with the point distribution for each phase of the tournament.

Medalists

Medal table

Team event

Group A

Algeria vs Réunion

Zambia vs Réunion

Algeria vs Zambia

Group B

Mauritius vs Botswana

South Africa vs Botswana

Mauritius vs South Africa

Group C

Egypt vs Ghana

Uganda vs Ghana

Egypt vs Uganda

Knockout stage

Bracket
<onlyinclude>
The draw was conducted on 22 October 2021 after the last match of the group stage.

Quarter-finals

Mauritius vs Uganda

Zambia vs South Africa

Semi-finals

Egypt vs Uganda

South Africa vs Algeria

Final

Egypt vs Algeria

Final ranking

Individual event

Men's singles

Seeds

 Julien Paul (third round)
 Adham Hatem Elgamal (champion)
 Youcef Sabri Medel (third round)
 Ahmed Salah (final)
 Ruan Snyman (second round)
 Brian Kasirye (quarter-finals)
 Mohamed Abderrahime Belarbi (third round)
 Aatish Lubah (quarter-finals)

Finals

Top half

Section 1

Section 2

Bottom half

Section 3

Section 4

Women's singles

Seeds

 Doha Hany (final)
 Johanita Scholtz (champion)
 Nour Ahmed Youssri (first round)
 Halla  Bouksani (second round)

Finals

Top half

Section 1

Section 2

Bottom half

Section 3

Section 4

Men's doubles

Seeds

 Koceila Mammeri / Youcef Sabri Medel (champion)
 Aatish Lubah / Julien Paul (quarter-finals)
 Adel Hamek / Mohamed Abderrahime Belarbi (quarter-finals)
 Jean Bernard Bongout / Tejraj Pultoo (quarter-finals)

Bracket

Women's doubles

Seeds

 Fadilah Mohamed Rafi / Tracy Naluwooza (semi-finals)
 Demi Botha / Deidre Laurens Jordaan (quarter-finals)

Bracket

Mixed doubles

Seeds

 Adham Hatem Elgamal / Doha Hany (final)
 Tejraj Pultoo / Kobita Dookhee (second round)
 Mohamed Mostafa Kamel / Nour Ahmed Youssri (second round)
 Jean Bernard Bongout / Jemimah Leung For Sang (second round)

Finals

Top half

Section 1

Section 2

Bottom half

Section 3

Section 4

References

External links 
 Individual result
 Team result

African Badminton Championships
African Badminton Championships
African Badminton Championships
African Badminton Championships
Badminton tournaments in Uganda
African Badminton Championships